Madha Lok Sabha constituency (43) is one of the 48 Lok Sabha (lower house of Indian parliament) constituencies of Maharashtra state in western India. This constituency was created on 19 February 2008 as a part of the implementation of the Presidential notification based on the recommendations of the Delimitation Commission of India constituted on 12 July 2002. It first held elections in 2009 and its first member of parliament (MP) was Sharad Pawar of the Nationalist Congress Party (NCP). As of the 2019 elections, the constituency's current MP is Ranjeetsinha Hindurao Naik Nimbalkar.

Assembly segments
At present, Madha Lok Sabha constituency comprises six Vidhan Sabha (legislative assembly) segments. These segments are:

Members of Parliament

Election results

General elections 2019

General elections 2014

General elections 2009

References

External links
Madha lok sabha  constituency election 2019 results details

Lok Sabha constituencies in Maharashtra
Lok Sabha constituencies in Maharashtra created in 2008
Solapur district
Satara district